The third season of the American television situation comedy Leave It to Beaver premiered on October 3, 1959 and concluded on June 25, 1960. It consisted of 39 episodes shot in black-and-white, each running approximately 25 minutes in length.

Episodes 

<onlyinclude>{{Episode table |background=#46a79c|overall=4 |season=4 |title=19 |director=15 |writer=21 |airdate=14 |prodcode=7 |episodes=

{{Episode list/sublist|Leave It to Beaver (season 3)
| EpisodeNumber   = 91
| EpisodeNumber2  = 13
| Title           = June's Birthday
| DirectedBy      = David Butler
| WrittenBy       = 
| OriginalAirDate = 
| ProdCode        = 13214
| ShortSummary    = June insists the family not make a fuss for her birthday. Ward asks the boys to make a little fuss - 5 dollars worth. Wally and Beaver cannot agree on what to buy, getting into a fight and splitting the money to buy separate presents. Wally buys her a nice pigskin wallet with her initials on it. Beaver and Larry seek Mrs. Mondello's advice, and she says she would just like a nice blouse. They go to a "ritzy" store where Larry sees a neat blouse that the saleslady claims is their exquisite La Parisien model. Beaver is excited for his mother to open the present. June tells Beaver the blouse is beautiful but in private asks Ward who would sell a child such a ghastly thing. Still competing, the boys are in the kitchen where Wally tells Beaver his present is creepy and their mother didn't want to hurt his feelings. Beaver continues to believe that June likes the blouse, asking when she will wear it, and she finally agrees she will wear it to the Mother's Club tea. The next morning June is wearing the blouse; Beaver is proud, but Wally asks if she is really going to wear that thing in front of people. Ward mocks one of the phrases on the back of the blouse "Ooo-La-La" and suggests she change; she can put the blouse back on when she comes home. At the tea, Beaver's class is brought in as a surprise to sing for the mothers. Beaver is hurt to see that his mother is not wearing the blouse. He begins to sulk and forgets to sing. At home June discusses the situation with Wally - she doesn't know what to say to Beaver. Wally says she double-crossed Beaver but she doesn't have to be chicken. June explains to Beaver there are certain things people say to be kind, and you learn how to spare people's feelings by not always saying what you feel. Beaver says he's not a very good blouse-picker-outer and forgives her.

Guests: Rusty Stevens as Larry Mondello, Madge Blake as Mrs. Mondello, Claire Carleton as Saleslady, Stanley Fafara as Whitey Whitney, Sue Randall as Miss Landers, Jean Vander Pyl as Woman's Club Member, Jeri Weil as Judy Hensler..
| LineColor       = 46a79c
}}

}}</onlyinclude>

 References 
 Applebaum, Irwyn. The World According to Beaver. TV Books, 1998. .
 IMDb: Leave It to Beaver. Season 3.
 Mathers, Jerry....And Jerry Mathers as "The Beaver"''. Berkley Boulevard Books, 1998. .

3